Busolwe General Hospital, also Busolwe Hospital, is a hospital in Busolwe Town, Butaleja District, in the Eastern Region of Uganda. It is a public hospital, owned by the Ugandan Government and is administered by Butaleja District Local Government.

Location
The coordinates of Busolwe Hospital are: 0°50'58.0"N, 33°55'45.0"E (Latitude:0.849449; Longitude:33.929156).

Overview
The hospital was built in 1970. Since it was commissioned, the hospital infrastructure has not received any refurbishment or re-equipping. The buildings need renovation and remodeling.

Renovations
In 2008, the Government of Uganda signed a debt swap agreement, with the Kingdom of Spain involving the creation of a Trust Fund. The resources of that trust fund will be used to construct and equip Kawolo General Hospital and Busolwe General Hospital. The renovations, which are expected to take four years, include the following:

1. Renovate existing staff housing 2. Build new staff houses
3. Build a new Emergency department (Casualty department) 4. Build a trauma ward 5. Build new operating rooms (operating theatres) 6. Build a new mortuary with cold facilities 7. Build a new, bigger maternity ward, with antenatal wing 8. Build new operating rooms dedicated to obstetric cases 9. Construct a water reservoir with capacity of  
10. Rehabilitate existing water sources and install solar-powered pumps 11. Procure an ambulance for emergencies and a double cabin pick-up for outreach services. As of July 2019, those planned renovations had not been carried out yet.

See also
List of hospitals in Uganda

References

External links
 Website of Uganda Ministry of Health
 Busolwe town council in Butaleja: Get there before 7 pm or don’t bother

Hospitals in Uganda
Butaleja District
Eastern Region, Uganda
Hospital buildings completed in 1970
1970 establishments in Uganda